Glen Cove is a station along the Oyster Bay Branch of the Long Island Rail Road. It is located between Pearsall Avenue and Norfolk Lane north of Duck Pond Road in the city of Glen Cove, New York.

Glen Cove station, (née Nassau), was built in 1895 at the behest of the "Gold Coast" millionaires such as the Pratts and J.P. Morgan who were looking for a more dignified station to disembark. The picturesque station has been featured in several movies, including Sabrina, Hello Again, and several commercials.

No bus access is available for this station (unlike the nearby Glen Street station), however local taxicabs do stop there.

Station layout
This station has two high-level side platforms, each four cars long.

References

External links

June 2006 Photo (Unofficial LIRR History Website)
Glen Cove (old Nassau) and Glen Street Stations (Sam Berliner III's Victorian Stations of the LIRR)
 Station from Duck Pond Road from Google Maps Street View

Glen Cove, New York
Long Island Rail Road stations in Nassau County, New York
Railway stations in the United States opened in 1895